The 1919 Kalamazoo football team was an American football team that represented Kalamazoo College during the 1919 college football season as a member of the Michigan Intercollegiate Athletic Association  (MIAA). The team compiled a 5–2 record, with losses to co-national champion Notre Dame and a 9–1 Detroit Titans team. Kalamazoo went 4–0 in conference play and was crowned the 1919 MIAA champion.

Schedule

References

Kalamazoo
Kalamazoo Hornets football seasons
Kalamazoo football